Montenegrin–Serbian relations are foreign relations between Montenegro and Serbia. From 1918 until 2006 the two states were united under the Kingdom of Yugoslavia, the Socialist Federal Republic of Yugoslavia, and Serbia and Montenegro. There is controversy regarding the national identity of Montenegro due to recent political developments in the region. There is a debate on the ethnic identification of Montenegrins (whether they are Serbs or not), and the name of the national language (Montenegrin versus Serbian). Despite this, the two countries have maintained mostly friendly relations.

History

Pre-Yugoslavia

Before Yugoslavia existed, there was very little distinction between Serbs and Montenegrins as both peoples largely held allegiance to the Serbian Orthodox Church, which directly influenced the establishment of the Prince-Bishopric of Montenegro in 1697. Petar II Petrović-Njegoš, one of the most historic rulers of the theocratic Montenegrin Prince-Bishopric, composed literature which would later be considered the backbone of the history of Montenegrin literature.

World War I and Yugoslavia

After the Congress of Berlin formally recognized the independence of the de facto sovereign states, relations were improving until officially established in 1897. The Kingdom of Montenegro was Serbia's closest ally in World War I until surrendering to Austria-Hungary in 1916. Montenegro was annexed and subsequently declared under governance of the Kingdom of Yugoslavia on December 20, 1918. Weeks after this date, separatist Montenegrin Greens under Krsto Zrnov Popović started a violent insurrection against pro-Yugoslav unionists known as the Christmas Uprising on January 7, 1919. Despite their separatism, they declared themselves as Serbs.

World War II

After the Invasion of Yugoslavia, two challenging resistance groups were active in the territories of Serbia minor and Montenegro; the Yugoslav Partisans and the Chetniks. Serbs and Montenegrins composed 35% of the ethnic composition of Yugoslav Partisans in World War II. Montenegrins have been cited to have been the second largest group within the Chetnik movement after the Serbs. Montenegrin Chetniks were led and organized largely by Pavle Đurišić, a controversial commander who was killed with his army by Croatian Nazi collaborators in the Battle of Lijevče Field. Đurišić is considered a part of Serbian-Montenegrin history as he was a Serbian-Montenegrin unionist, which is thought to be the reason why Montenegrin separatist Sekula Drljević aided Ustaša forces to kill him.

Serbia and Montenegro as member states of the Federal Republic of Yugoslavia (1992–2003)

The first Serbian Republic and the Montenegrin republic composed the Federal Republic of Yugoslavia during the breakup of Yugoslavia. Montenegro remained a part of Yugoslavia after an overwhelming majority of the population voted for unity with Serbia in 1992. In the Yugoslav Wars, Montenegrin forces notably led the Siege of Dubrovnik. Radovan Karadžić, former war-time president of Republika Srpska and convicted war criminal, is often mistaken as a Bosnian Serb—he was in fact born in Šavnik to a family from the Drobnjak tribe. He was known to have supported a united state between Republika Srpska, Serbia, and Montenegro. Throughout his mandate, Yugoslav president Slobodan Milošević appointed several Montenegrin politicians like Milo Đukanović and Svetozar Marović who would cooperate with his regime to a great degree and then denounce him years later. On February 4, 2003, the Federal Republic of Yugoslavia changed its name to Serbia and Montenegro. The Constitutional Charter of Serbia and Montenegro, the amended constitution of the previous Federal Republic, allowed either of the two member states to hold an independence referendum once every three years. After the assassination of Zoran Đinđić on March 12, 2003, a massive police operation dubbed Operation Sabre was undertaken by the government of Serbia and Montenegro in which various locations in Montenegro (particularly Budva) were investigated due to previous assassination attempts originating from there.

Montenegrin independence referendum (2006)

The last independence referendum in Montenegro was held on May 21, 2006. It was approved by 55.5% of voters, narrowly passing the 55% threshold set by the European Union. By 23 May, preliminary referendum results were recognized by all five permanent members of the United Nations Security Council, indicating widespread international recognition of Montenegro once independence would be formally declared. On 31 May the referendum commission officially confirmed the results of the referendum, verifying that 55.5% of the population of Montenegrin voters had voted in favor of independence. Milo Đukanović, the PM at the time, was the leader of the pro-independent bloc centered around the Democratic Party of Socialists of Montenegro. Predrag Bulatović led the coalition of pro-unionist parties during the referendum campaign.

Contemporary relations
Montenegro has an embassy in Belgrade and Serbia has an embassy in Podgorica. Both countries are full members of the Council of Europe, the Organization for Security and Co-operation in Europe (OSCE), and the Central European Free Trade Agreement (CEFTA). Both countries are also recognized as potential candidate countries by the European Union.

Montenegro's recognition of Kosovo
After the Kosovo declaration of independence, Serbia expelled the ambassador of Montenegro in October 2008, following the Montenegrin recognition of the independence of Kosovo. Montenegrin Prime Minister Milo Đukanović slammed his colleague's forced removal from Belgrade, claiming that relations between the two nations have become "unacceptably bad." Almost one year later Serbia finally accepted Igor Jovović as the new Montenegrin ambassador.

SNS government in Serbia (2012–present)

After being elected the new Serbian president in May 2012, SNS-candidate Tomislav Nikolić gave an interview to Televizija Crne Gore, during which he stated:

In June 2014, a subtle media conflict ensued between Đukanović and Serbian PM Aleksandar Vučić. Multiple Serbian tabloids, including Informer and Kurir had published articles discussing Đukanović's alleged relationship to threats and attacks on Montenegrin journalists. Đukanović immediately reacted to the Serbian tabloid articles, and released a series of controversial statements on June 17, calling the articles "the most ordinary stupidity," and adding that "I believe my colleague in Belgrade will get to the bottom of these writings which reminisce about 2003." The statement about 2003 was directly referring to the assassination of Zoran Đinđić, who was in 2003 the prime minister of Serbia. Many news portals in Serbia regarded Đukanović's comments to Vučić as having a threatening nature.

On November 28, 2020, the Serbian Ambassador to Montenegro, Vladimir Božović, was declared a persona non grata due to his controversial statement regarding the Podgorica Assembly. Afterwards he was expelled from Montenegro. As of February 2023, a new Ambassador of Serbia to Montenegro has still not been named.

In February 2021, Serbia donated 4,000 COVID-19 vaccines to Montenegro. Prime Minister Ana Brnabić stated the intention behind the donation is "to open a new chapter in relations between Serbia and Montenegro" and "to show solidarity in the time of crisis".

By theme

Crime
The Montenegrin mafia is known to operate illegally in Serbia, most especially in Belgrade. It is thought that Montenegrin elements induced the assassination of Serbian warlord Arkan on January 15, 2000. On October 9, 2009, Montenegrin businessman Branislav Šaranović who owned the casino in Slavija Hotel in Belgrade was killed by firearms in the city's upscale neighbourhood of Dedinje by two masked assassins. A new wave of assassinations by Montenegrin underworld criminals began with a car bomb that killed controversial businessman Boško Raičević in Dorćol on June 23, 2012. Only a couple of weeks later, Tanjug released a report claiming that the long-disappeared Montenegrin drug lord Darko Šarić offered a €10 million contract for professional assassins to liquidate Boris Tadić, Ivica Dačić, and other Serbian politicians and police chiefs.

Serbs of Montenegro

Montenegrins of Serbia

See also

Serbian–Montenegrin unionism
 Foreign relations of Montenegro
 Foreign relations of Serbia
 Accession of Montenegro to the European Union
 Accession of Serbia to the European Union
 Serbia and Montenegro
 Agreement on Succession Issues of the Former Socialist Federal Republic of Yugoslavia

References

 
Serbia
Bilateral relations of Serbia